Notelaea lloydii, commonly known as Lloyd's olive, is a shrub in the olive family, found in Queensland, Australia. It is listed as "vulnerable" under the Commonwealth Environment Protection and Biodiversity Conservation Act 1999.

The species was formally described by Gordon Guymer in 1987, based on plant material collected in Ipswich.

References

lloydii
Flora of Queensland
Plants described in 1987